Sergei Sergeyevich Savvin (born 25 April 1987) is a former Russian professional footballer.

Club career
He played in the Kazakhstan Premier League for FC Irtysh Pavlodar in 2008.

External links
 
 

1987 births
Living people
Russian footballers
Association football defenders
FC Irtysh Pavlodar players
FC Metallurg Lipetsk players
FC Khimik Dzerzhinsk players
FC Lokomotiv Moscow players
FC Oryol players
FC Spartak Kostroma players
Kazakhstan Premier League players
Russian expatriate footballers
Expatriate footballers in Kazakhstan
Russian expatriate sportspeople in Kazakhstan